Andy Williams Sings Rodgers and Hammerstein is the second studio album by American pop singer Andy Williams and was orchestrated and conducted by Alvy West.  It was released in February 1958 by Cadence Records and focuses upon songs composed by Richard Rodgers with lyrics by Oscar Hammerstein II.

When the album was reissued by Cadence in 1963, the Review Panel in the somewhat newly renamed Billboard magazine updated the rating it was given upon its initial release to reflect the fact that "Williams, a seller of stature," had become "increasingly hot, thanks to regular TV exposure and hits on his current label."  Whereas the 1958 review yielded only a four-star rating, the 1963 reissue garnered the magazine's coveted Spotlight Pick, which was given to albums with the greatest sales potential.

The album was released on compact disc for the first time by Collectables Records on September 12, 2000, as tracks 13 through 24 on a pairing of two albums on CD with tracks 1 through 12 consisting of Williams's 1958 collection of Cadence Records singles that was simply entitled Andy Williams. Collectables included this CD in a box set entitled Classic Album Collection, Vol. 1, which contains 17 of his studio albums and three compilations and was released on June 26, 2001.

Reception

In AllMusic, William Ruhlmann wrote that Williams "wasn't really a rocker, even if he sometimes pretended to be one for commercial purposes at the behest of Cadence Records head Archie Bleyer" and that he "was allowed to show his true colors by recording a collection of Rodgers & Hammerstein songs from the musicals Oklahoma!, Carousel, South Pacific, and The King and I. The result was the birth of the Andy Williams his fans knew from then on." Ruhlmann felt that "Williams revealed his warm tenor with its touches of Mel Tormé's velvety tones on material he clearly felt comfortable with" and that his "buoyancy and sincerity as a singer were never better displayed than they were here."

Track listing 
All songs written by Richard Rodgers & Oscar Hammerstein II

Side one
 "Some Enchanted Evening" – 4:19
 "If I Loved You" – 2:25
 "Getting to Know You" – 2:04
 "This Nearly Was Mine" – 2:55
 "Bali Ha'i" – 3:00
 "I Have Dreamed" – 3:06

Side two
 "People Will Say We're in Love" – 3:03
 "Younger Than Springtime" – 3:33
 "I Whistle a Happy Tune" – 1:50
 "We Kiss in a Shadow" – 3:33
 "The Surrey With the Fringe on Top" – 3:28
 "Hello Young Lovers" – 2:44

Personnel 
 Alvy West  – conductor, orchestration
 Andy Williams – vocals

References

Bibliography

 

1958 albums
Andy Williams albums
Cadence Records albums
Rodgers and Hammerstein
Covers albums